Garry M. Gaber is a game designer, director, project leader, artist, writer and programmer who worked on a number of notable LucasArts Video Games from 1994 through 2003.  He is probably best known for his work as Project Leader and Designer on the Star Wars Galactic Battlegrounds franchise.

He received a Bachelor of Fine Arts from New York University and worked in the engineering field before being hired by LucasArts in 1994.

He currently is owner of Escape Hatch Entertainment, LLC, and has worked on two educational titles geared toward high school students, "Discover Babylon" and "Immune Attack".

Game development history
 Star Wars: Rebel Assault II: The Hidden Empire (1995)
 Star Wars: Shadows of the Empire (1996)
 Mortimer and the Riddles of the Medallion (1996)
 Star Wars: Masters of Teräs Käsi (1997)
 Star Wars Jedi Knight: Dark Forces II (1997)
 Star Wars: Force Commander (2000)
 Star Wars Galactic Battlegrounds (2001)
 Star Wars Galactic Battlegrounds: Clone Campaigns (2002)
 Star Wars Galactic Battlegrounds Saga (2002)

References

 Smith, Rob (2008). "Rogue Leaders: The Story of LucasArts'', pg. 240.
 Interview with Garry Gaber

External links
 Garry Gaber's MobyGames profile
 
 Escape Hatch Entertainment website
  Immune Attack free download site

American video game designers
American video game directors
Living people
Lucasfilm people
Year of birth missing (living people)
Place of birth missing (living people)
Missing middle or first names